Pilolcura (Mapudungun for hollow stone) is a beach and hamlet in Valdivia Province, Los Ríos Region, Chile. It is named after the conglomerate formations on its beach, which resemble a stone castle with large arches.

External links
Locator map

Landforms of Los Ríos Region
Beaches of Chile
Populated places in Valdivia Province
Coasts of Los Ríos Region
South American sea lion colonies